Dual photography is a photographic technique that uses Helmholtz reciprocity to capture the light field of all light paths from a structured illumination source to a camera. Image processing software can then be used to reconstruct the scene as it would have been seen from the viewpoint of the projector.

See also 
 Light-field camera

References

External links 
 http://graphics.stanford.edu/papers/dual_photography/
Photographic techniques
Imaging